Press Up Entertainment is a cinema, hotel, pub, retail and restaurant operator based in Dublin, Ireland. Ownership is shared between Paddy McKillen, Jr., son of Paddy McKillen, and Matt Ryan.

Their properties include the Clarence Hotel, the Dean Hotel, the Dean Hotel Cork, the Devlin Hotel, the Mayson Hotel, the Irish franchise for Wagamama and the Stella Theatre cinema chain. They also operate two formerly franchised Tower Records locations, which have outlasted the US-based parent chain by many years.

Most of their new properties are located in new developments by Oakmount, a property developer with the same owners but operated independently

They have announced an entry in to operating bowling alleys, with a development at Dundrum Town Centre

The company investigated an initial public offering in 2018, but this was cancelled in 2019.

In July 2022, it was announced that Press Up would open its first UK venue after converting the listed Methodist Central Hall, Birmingham into a 150 bedroom hotel and event space.

References

Hospitality companies of Ireland
Tourism in the Republic of Ireland
Pubs in Dublin (city)